Emilie Haya Moatti (born 27 June 1980) is an Israeli activist, filmmaker, writer and politician. She was a member of the Knesset for the Israeli Labor Party from 2021 to 2022.

Biography
Moatti was born in Kfar Saba in 1980, the oldest of six children in a religious family of Tunisian-Jewish descent. After dropping out of high school to work, she began studying at the University of Paris in 2003. While in Paris she worked as a producer and became a spokeswoman for the Israeli Cinema Festival. She subsequently worked as a filmmaker and political commentator, writing for Haaretz. She became involved in peace activism, serving as a director the Geneva Initiative. In 2014 she joined the board of WePower, a feminist group. In 2018 she won the Ministry of Education First Book Prize for her novel Blue Marks. She is married to former ambassador Daniel Shek.

Political career
A member of the Labor Party, Moatti was placed fifteenth on the joint list of Labor, Meretz and Gesher for the 2020 Knesset elections,  but the alliance won only seven seats. Prior to the 2021 elections she was placed third on the Labor Party list, and was elected to the Knesset as the party won seven seats.

During the constructive vote of no confidence to remove the Netanyahu government and install the Bennett-Lapid "change" coalition, Moatti's vote was crucial. She was unable to stand as a result of a spinal infection and had to be rushed back from hospital on a stretcher to cast her vote for the new government, which was ultimately installed by a 60–59 vote. For the 2022 elections Moatti was placed sixth on the Labor list, but lost her seat as the party won only four seats.

References

External links

1980 births
Living people
People from Netanya
University of Paris alumni
Israeli filmmakers
Israeli people of Tunisian-Jewish descent
Israeli writers
Israeli Labor Party politicians
Members of the 24th Knesset (2021–2022)
Women members of the Knesset
21st-century Israeli women politicians